Johannes von Tepl (c. 1350 – c. 1415), also known as Johannes von Saaz, was a Bohemian writer of the German language, one of the earliest known writers of prose in Early New High German (or late Middle German—depending on the criteria). He was literate in Czech, German and Latin.

Not much is known about him; historians presume that he probably studied at universities in Prague, Bologna and Padua. In 1383, he became a solicitor in Žatec (Saaz) and in 1386 a rector of the town's Latin school. He lived in Prague from 1411. He spent almost all of his life in the Kingdom of Bohemia, during the reign of kings Charles and Wenceslaus.

Johannes von Tepl is best known for his early humanist poem Der Ackermann aus Böhmen (Ploughman of Bohemia), sometimes also called Der Ackermann und der Tod (Ploughman and Death), written around 1401 and first printed in 1460. It is a dialogue of Death and the ploughman, who accuses Death because his wife Margaretha recently died. Central themes of the book are their opposing views on life, mankind, and morality. (In the history of Bohemia, the ploughman is an important symbol of Bohemian kings—Přemysl, the legendary founder of the Přemyslid dynasty, was originally a ploughman.) The poem is regarded as one of the most important German poems in the late Middle Ages.

References

External links
Complete text of Ackermann aus Böhmen
Illuminated manuscript of Ackermann aus Böhmen
A modern English translation of the Ackermann aus Böhmen
 

1350 births
1415 deaths
People from Žatec
German Bohemian people
Bohemian literature
German poets
German Renaissance humanists
German male poets